Colin Ford (born September 12, 1996) is an American actor. He is known for his roles as Josh Wheeler in Daybreak, Joe McAlister in Under the Dome, the voice of Jake on Jake and the Never Land Pirates, Mikey on Can You Teach My Alligator Manners?, which earned him a Young Artist Award, young Sam Winchester in Supernatural and Dylan Mee in the family movie We Bought a Zoo.

Early life and education
Ford was born in Nashville, Tennessee. He attended Campbell Hall School. He later attended Oaks Christian School, a college preparatory school in Westlake Village, California.

Career 
Ford enjoyed being in front of the camera, which led to his start in the entertainment business. At age four, he modeled for print ads for regional and national retailers. At age five, he made his film debut as Clinton Jr. in the feature film Sweet Home Alabama. He obtained more roles in independent films such as Moved, The Book of Jaene and Dumb and Dumberer: When Harry Met Lloyd.

In 2004, Ford portrayed Matthew Steed in the movie The Work and the Glory. In 2005, he had a guest role in Smallville. Following Smallville, he reprised his role as Matthew Steed in The Work and the Glory: American Zion, then played a lead role as Jackson Patch in Dog Days of Summer. Ford played Zeph in the epic adventure In the Name of the King: A Dungeon Siege Tale, which was released in April 2007. Ford voiced the role of Dart, the reindeer, in the feature film Christmas Is Here Again, also in 2007.

Ford starred in the film We Bought a Zoo, which was released in December 2011, in which he played Dylan. After filming We Bought a Zoo, Ford was cast in the TV series Under The Dome, playing Joe McAlister.

In 2018, it was announced that Ford had been cast in the main role of Josh Wheeler in the Netflix comedy drama series Daybreak. The series premiered on October 24, 2019, and was canceled after one season.

Filmography

Film

Television

Awards and nominations

References

External links

 
 

1996 births
Living people
21st-century American male actors
Male actors from Nashville, Tennessee
Male actors from Los Angeles
American male child actors
American male film actors
American male television actors
American male voice actors